Bariwala is a town and a nagar panchayat in Muktsar district  in the state of Punjab, India.

Demographics
 India census, Bariwala had a population of 8668. Males constitute 53% of the population and females 47%. Bariwala has an average literacy rate of 72%, lower than the national average of 74.4%; with 77% of the males and 66% of females literate. 11% of the population is under 6 years of age.

References

Cities and towns in Sri Muktsar Sahib district
Villages in Sri Muktsar Sahib district